Highway 40 is a highway in the northwest portion of the Canadian province of Saskatchewan connecting Alberta (where it continues as Highway 14) to Highway 3,  west of Shellbrook, Saskatchewan. Areas of this highway between the Alberta border and North Battleford are called the Poundmaker Trail.  Pitikwahanapiwiyin (c. 1842 – 4 July 1886), commonly known as Poundmaker, was a Plains Cree chief known as a peacemaker and defender of his people. The main feature along this highway is access between North Battleford and near Prince Albert. This is a primary Saskatchewan  highway maintained by the provincial government. All of this highway is paved.

Communities along the route
 Marsden
 Neilburg 
 Baldwinton 
 Cut Knife
 Sweetgrass First Nation
 Battleford held the Government House, the seat of government of the NWT from 1876-1883 which burned down on July 7, 2003.
 North Battleford is located directly across the North Saskatchewan River from the town of Battleford. Together, the two communities are known as The Battlefords.
 Hafford 
 Krydor 
 Blaine Lake
 Marcelin
 Leask
 Parkside 
 Shellbrook One of Canada’s most respected writers, James Sinclair Ross, was born in the Wild Rose school district just northeast of Shellbrook in 1908.

Major Attractions
Highway 40 hosts the following lakes, beaches, historical sites and buildings, and provincial parks.

 North Battleford Court House List of National Historic Sites of Canada 1909 symbol of justice in new province
 North Battleford Airport: The North Battleford Gliding Centre, a Royal Canadian Air Cadet gliding centre, stores its gliders in Hangar IV of the airport, and has an office in the terminal building.
 North Battleford is the home of one of four branches of the Saskatchewan Western Development Museum. This branch focuses on the agricultural history of Saskatchewan. This branch includes a pioneer village.
 Battle River
 there is a provincial marker point of interest where the highway crosses The Battle River
 Shellbrook Museum

Nearby
 The Battlefords Provincial Park
 Fort Battleford National Historic Site
 Cutknife Hill Historic Site
 Chief Poundmaker Historic Center
 Poundmaker Reserves
 Attons Lake Regional Park and area Golf Course
 Table Mountain Ski Hill is a downhill ski mountain for skiers and snowboarders. There are available 8 separate runs with the longest being .
 Former Prince Albert City Hall List of National Historic Sites of Canada

History
 Battle of Cut Knife occurred near this highway.
Highways and Transportation Minister Pat Atkinson announced that Highway 40 is due for improvement spring of 2001.
Highways and Transportation Minister Maynard Sonntag announced that Highway 40 underwent improvements summer of 2004. This re-surfacing was a joint program with the federal government through the Prairie Grain Roads Program (PGRP)

Major Intersections 
From west to east:

See also
National Historic Site of Canada
List of National Historic Sites of Canada

References

External links
A document from Saskatchewan Highways and Transportation: Winter Highway Conditions
Saskatchewan Highways Website-- Highway Numbering
Saskatchewan Road Map RV Itineraries
Big Things of Canada, A Celebration of Community Monuments of Canada

040
North Battleford